A hybrid market allows a stockbroker to choose to have an order executed immediately in a fully automated electronic exchange or to have it routed to the trading floor, where it is completed manually via the more traditional live auction method, in the presence of a specialist broker. The fully electronic method has the advantage of speed, often completing orders in less than one second, but comparable manual transactions take an average of nine seconds. However, the live auction method differentiates itself with the human interaction and expert judgment of the specialists, which are currently seen as obsolete since most customers seem to prefer speed, and the New York Stock Exchange (NYSE) is working to redefine the role played by the specialists in the market. The NYSE is seen as the world's premier example of a hybrid market.

References

Financial markets
Financial economics
New York Stock Exchange
Stock market
Investment